Verkhnyaya Lugovatka is a rural locality (a selo) and the administrative center of Verkhnelugovatskoye Rural Settlement, Verkhnekhavsky District, Voronezh Oblast, Russia. The population was 576 as of 2010. There are 7 streets.

Geography 
Verkhnyaya Lugovatka is located 19 km northeast of Verkhnyaya Khava (the district's administrative centre) by road. Priozernoye is the nearest rural locality.

References 

Rural localities in Verkhnekhavsky District